Archidasyphyllum is a genus of flowering plants belonging to subfamily Barnadesioideae of the family Asteraceae.

Its native range is Central and Southern Chile to Southern Argentina.

Species:

Archidasyphyllum diacanthoides 
Archidasyphyllum excelsum

References

Asteraceae
Asteraceae genera